The Andhra Pradesh football team is an Indian football team representing Andhra Pradesh in Indian state football competitions including the Santosh Trophy.

History
They have appeared in the Santosh Trophy finals twice, and have won the trophy once. Prior to 1959, the team competed as Andhra football team when the Hyderabad Football Association was merged with the Andhra Football Association to establish the combined team.

They have failed to qualify for the final rounds of 69th Santosh Trophy (2015).

Current squad

Honours

State
 Andhra Pradesh
 Santosh Trophy
 Winners (1): 1965–66
 Runners-up (1): 1963–64
 B.C. Roy Trophy
 Winners (2): 1965–66, 1975–76
 Runners-up (6): 1964–65, 1967–68, 1972–73, 1977–78, 1978–79, 1992–93
 Mir Iqbal Hussain Trophy
 Runners-up (1): 1994–95

Others
 Andhra Pradesh
 Sait Nagjee Football Tournament
 Runners-up (4): 1962, 1967, 1976, 1977

References

Football in Andhra Pradesh
Santosh Trophy teams